Galium andrewsii is a species of flowering plant in the coffee family known by the common names phloxleaf bedstraw, Andrews' bedstraw, and needlemat galium.

It is native to California and Baja California, where grows in a number of dry habitats such as chaparral and woodland.

Description
Galium andrewsii is a low, clumping or mat-forming perennial herb growing no higher than about 22 centimeters. Narrow, needlelike green to grayish leaves grow in whorls of four on the slender branches. Each is up to a centimeter long and has a sharp point tipped with a hair.

The plant is dioecious with individuals bearing either male or female flowers; the male flowers are produced in clusters and the female flowers are solitary. They are greenish-yellow and similar in appearance otherwise.

The fruit is a berry.

Subspecies
Galium andrewsii ssp. andrewsii
Galium andrewsii ssp. gatense

References

External links
Calflora Database: Galium andrewsii (Needlemat galium,  phlox leaved bedstraw, phloxleaf bedstraw)
USDA Plants Profile for Galium andrewsii
Galium andrewsii — UC Photos gallery

andrewsii
Flora of California
Flora of Baja California
Flora of the Sierra Nevada (United States)
Natural history of the California chaparral and woodlands
Natural history of the California Coast Ranges
Natural history of the Peninsular Ranges
Natural history of the San Francisco Bay Area
Natural history of the Santa Monica Mountains
Natural history of the Transverse Ranges
Plants described in 1865
Dioecious plants
Flora without expected TNC conservation status